Geopolymers are inorganic, typically ceramic, alumino-silicate forming long-range, covalently bonded, non-crystalline (amorphous) networks. Obsidian (volcanic glass) fragments are a component of some geopolymer blends. Commercially produced geopolymers may be used for fire- and heat-resistant coatings and adhesives, medicinal applications, high-temperature ceramics, new binders for fire-resistant fiber composites, toxic and radioactive waste encapsulation and new cements for concrete. The properties and uses of geopolymers are being explored in many scientific and industrial disciplines: modern inorganic chemistry, physical chemistry, colloid chemistry, mineralogy, geology, and in other types of engineering process technologies. The field of geopolymers is a part of polymer science, chemistry and technology that forms one of the major areas of materials science. 

Polymers are either organic material, i.e. carbon-based, or inorganic polymer, for example silicon-based. The organic polymers comprise the classes of natural polymers (rubber, cellulose), synthetic organic polymers (textile fibers, plastics, films, elastomers, etc.) and natural biopolymers (biology, medicine, pharmacy). Raw materials used in the synthesis of silicon-based polymers are mainly rock-forming minerals of geological origin, hence the name: geopolymer. Joseph Davidovits coined the term in 1978 and created the non profit French scientific institution (Association Loi 1901) Institut Géopolymère (Geopolymer Institute).

According to T.F. Yen geopolymers can be classified into two major groups: pure inorganic geopolymers and organic containing geopolymers, synthetic analogues of naturally occurring macromolecules. In the following presentation, a geopolymer is essentially a mineral chemical compound or mixture of compounds consisting of repeating units, for example silico-oxide (-Si-O-Si-O-), silico-aluminate (-Si-O-Al-O-), ferro-silico-aluminate (-Fe-O-Si-O-Al-O-) or alumino-phosphate (-Al-O-P-O-), created through a process of geopolymerization. This mineral synthesis (geosynthesis) was first presented at an IUPAC symposium in 1976.

The microstructure of geopolymers is essentially temperature dependent: it is X-ray amorphous at room temperature, but evolves into a crystalline matrix at temperatures above 500 °C.

One can distinguish between two synthesis routes: in alkaline media (Na+, K+, Li+, Ca2+, Cs+ and the like); or
in acidic media with phosphoric acid, organic carboxylic acids from plant extracts (acetic, citric, oxalic, and humic acids).

In the beginning of 2000s the alkaline route was the most important in terms of research and development and commercial applications and is described below. The acidic route is discussed elsewhere.

What is a geopolymer?
In the 1950s, Viktor Glukovsky, of Kiev, USSR, developed concrete materials originally known under the names "soil silicate concretes" and "soil cements", but since the introduction of the geopolymer concept by Joseph Davidovits, 1991, the terminology and definitions of 'geopolymer' have become more diverse and often conflicting. The examples below were taken from 2011 scientific publications, written by scientists with different backgrounds.

Definitions of the term geopolymer

For chemists
'...Geopolymers consist of a polymeric Si–O–Al framework, similar to zeolites. The main difference to zeolite is geopolymers are amorphous instead of crystalline. The microstructure of geopolymers on a nanometer scale observed by TEM comprises small aluminosilicate clusters with pores dispersed within a highly porous network. The clusters sizes are between 5 and 10 nanometers.'

For geopolymer material chemists
'...The reaction produces SiO4 and AlO4, tetrahedral frameworks linked by shared oxygens as poly(sialates) or poly(sialate–siloxo) or poly(sialate–disiloxo) depending on the SiO2/Al2O3 ratio in the system. The connection of the tetrahedral frameworks is occurred via long-range covalent bonds. Thus, geopolymer structure is perceived as dense amorphous phase consisting of semi-crystalline 3-D alumino-silicate microstructure.'

For alkali-cement scientists
'... Geopolymers are framework structures produced by condensation of tetrahedral aluminosilicate units, with alkali metal ions balancing the charge associated with tetrahedral Al. Conventionally, geopolymers are synthesized from a two-part mix, consisting of an alkaline solution (often soluble silicate) and solid aluminosilicate materials. Geopolymerization occurs at ambient or slightly elevated temperature, where the leaching of solid aluminosilicate raw materials in alkaline solutions leads to the transfer of leached species from the solid surfaces into a growing gel phase, followed by nucleation and condensation of the gel phase to form a solid binder.'

For geopolymer ceramic chemists
'…Although geopolymer is generally X-ray amorphous if cured at standard pressures and temperatures, it will convert into crystalline ceramic phases like leucite or pollucite upon heating.'

For ceramic scientists
'...Geopolymers are a class of totally inorganic, alumino-silicate based ceramics that are charge balanced by group I oxides. They are rigid gels, which are made under relatively ambient conditions of temperature and pressure into near-net dimension bodies, and which can subsequently be converted to crystalline or glass-ceramic materials.'

Geopolymer synthesis

Ionic coordination or covalent bonding?

In 1937, W. L. Bragg published a method for classifying all kinds of silicates and their crystal structures based on the concept of the ionic theory by Linus Pauling. The fundamental unit is a tetrahedral complex consisting of a small cation such as Si4+, or Al3+ in tetrahedral coordination with four oxygens (Pauling's first rule). Many textbooks explain the geometry of the SiO44− tetrahedron and other mineral structures as determined by the relative sizes of the different ions.

This ionic coordination representation is no longer adapted to the requirements of geopolymer chemistry that is governed by covalent bonding mechanisms. The differences between the ionic concept (coordination) and the covalent bonding are profound. The double tetrahedron structure (coordination) is sharing one oxygen anion O2−, whereas in the Si-O-Si- molecular structure, the covalent bond is achieved through Si and O co-sharing only one electron. This results in stronger bond within the latter structure. The American mineralogist and geochemist G. V. Gibbs and his team studied the polymeric bond Si-O-Si-O and stated in 1982-2000:The successful modeling of the properties and structures of silica ... lends credence to the statement that a silica polymorph like quartz can be viewed as a giant molecule bound together by essentially the same forces that bind the atoms of the Si-O-Si skeleton into a small siloxane molecule. The term giant molecule used by G.V. Gibbs is equivalent to the definition of geopolymer and the wording small siloxane molecule describes the actual oligomers of organo-silicon compounds well known as silicone polymer. These siloxane oligomers have the same structure as the silico-aluminate oligomers described below in this article.

Geopolymerization starts with oligomers

Geopolymerization is the process of combining many small molecules known as oligomers into a covalently bonded network. The geo-chemical syntheses are carried out through oligomers (dimer, trimer, tetramer, pentamer) which provide the actual unit structures of the three-dimensional macromolecular edifice. In 2000, T.W. Swaddle and his team proved the existence of soluble isolated alumino-silicate molecules in solution in relatively high concentrations and high pH. One major improvement in their research was that their study was carried out at very low temperatures, as low as −9 °C. Indeed, it was discovered that the polymerization at room temperature of oligo-sialates was taking place on a time scale of around 100 milliseconds, i.e. 100 to 1000 times faster than the polymerization of ortho-silicate, oligo-siloxo units. At room temperature or higher, the reaction is so fast that it cannot be detected with conventional analytical equipment.

The image shows 5 soluble oligomers of the K-poly(sialate) / poly(sialate-siloxo) species, which are the actual starting units of potassium-based alumino-silicate geopolymerization.

Example of (-Si-O-Al-O-) geopolymerization with metakaolin MK-750 in alkaline medium

It involves four main phases comprising seven chemical reaction steps:
Alkaline depolymerization of the poly(siloxo) layer of kaolinite;
Formation of monomeric and oligomeric species, including the "ortho-sialate" (OH)3-Si-O-Al-(OH)3 molecule  (#1 in the figure);
In the presence of waterglass (soluble K-polysiloxonate), one gets the creation of ortho-sialate-disiloxo cyclic structure (e.g. #5 in the figure), whereby the hydroxide is liberated by condensation reactions and can react again;
Geopolymerization (polycondensation) into higher oligomers and polymeric 3D-networks.

The geopolymerization kinetics for Na-poly(sialate-siloxo) and K-poly(sialate-siloxo) are slightly different respectively. This is probably due to the different dimensions of the Na+ and K+ cations, K+ being bigger than Na+.

Example of zeolitic (Si-O-Al-O-) geopolymerization with fly ash in alkaline medium

It involves 5 main phases
Nucleation stage in which the aluminosilicates from the fly ash particle dissolve in the alkaline medium (Na+), releasing aluminates and silicates, probably as monomers.
These monomers inter-react to form dimers, which in turn react with other monomers to form trimers, tetramers and so on.
When the solution reaches saturation, an aluminum-rich gel (denominated Gel 1) precipitates.
As the reaction progresses, more Si-O groups from the initial solid source dissolve, increasing the silicon concentration in the medium and gradually raising the proportion of silicon in the zeolite precursor gel (Gel 2).
Polycondensation into zeolite-like 3D-frameworks.

Geopolymer 3D-frameworks

Geopolymerization forms aluminosilicate frameworks that are similar to those of rock-forming minerals. Yet, there are major differences. In 1994, Davidovits presented a theoretical structure for K-poly(sialate-siloxo) (K)-(Si-O-Al-O-Si-O) that was consistent with the NMR spectra. It does not show the presence of water in the structure because he only focused on the relationship between Si, Al, Na, K, atoms. Water is present only at temperatures below 150 °C – 200 °C, essentially in the form of -OH groups, whereas numerous geopolymer industrial and commercial applications work at temperatures above 200 °C, up to 1400 °C, i.e. at temperatures above dehydroxylation. Nevertheless, scientists working on low temperature applications, such as cements and waste management, tried to pinpoint cation hydration and water molecules. This model shows an incompletely reacted geopolymer (left in the figure), which involves free Si-OH groups that will later with time or with temperature polycondense with opposed Al-O-K, into Si-O-Al-O sialate bonds. The water released by this reaction either remains in the pores, is associated with the framework similarly to zeolitic water, or can be released and removed. Several 3D-frameworks are described in the book 'Geopolymer Chemistry and Applications'. After dehydroxylation (and dehydration), generally above 250 °C, geopolymers become more and more crystalline (right in the picture) and above 500-1000 °C (depending on the nature of the alkali cation present) crystallise and have X-ray diffraction patterns and framework structures identical to their geological analogues.

Commercial applications

There exist a wide variety of potential and existing applications. Some of the geopolymer applications are still in development whereas others are already industrialized and commercialized. See the incomplete list provided by the Geopolymer Institute. They are listed in three major categories:

Geopolymer resins and binders
Fire-resistant materials, thermal insulation, foams;
Low-energy ceramic tiles, refractory items, thermal shock refractories;
High-tech resin systems, paints, binders and grouts;
Bio-technologies (materials for medicinal applications);
Foundry industry (resins), tooling for the manufacture of organic fiber composites;
Composites for infrastructures repair and strengthening, fire-resistant and heat-resistant high-tech carbon-fiber composites for aircraft interior and automobile;
Radioactive and toxic waste containment;

Geopolymer cements and concretes
Low-tech building materials (clay bricks),
Low-CO2 cements and concretes;

Arts and archaeology
Decorative stone artifacts, arts and decoration;
Cultural heritage, archaeology and history of sciences.

Geopolymer resins and binders
The class of geopolymer materials is described by Davidovits to comprise:
Metakaolin MK-750-based geopolymer binder
chemical formula (Na,K)-(Si-O-Al-O-Si-O-), ratio Si:Al=2 (range 1.5 to 2.5)
Silica-based geopolymer binder
chemical formula (Na,K)-n(Si-O-)-(Si-O-Al-), ratio Si:Al>20 (range 15 to 40).
Sol-gel-based geopolymer binder (synthetic MK-750)
chemical formula (Na,K)-(Si-O-Al-O-Si-O-), ratio Si:Al=2

The first geopolymer resin was described in a French patent application filed by J. Davidovits in 1979. The American patent, US 4,349,386, was granted on Sept. 14, 1982 with the title Mineral Polymers and methods of making them. It essentially involved the geopolymerization of alkaline soluble silicate [waterglass or (Na,K)-polysiloxonate] with calcined kaolinitic clay (later coined metakaolin MK-750 to highlight the importance of the temperature of calcination, namely 750 °C in this case). In 1985, Kenneth MacKenzie and his team from New-Zealand, discovered the Al(V) coordination of calcined kaolinite (MK-750), describing a "chemical shift intermediate between tetrahedral and octahedral." This had a great input towards a better understanding of its geopolymeric reactivity.

Since 1979, a variety of resins, binders and grouts were developed by the chemical industry, worldwide.

Potential utilization for geopolymer composites materials
Metakaolin MK-750-based and silica-based geopolymer resins are used to impregnate fibers and fabrics to obtain geopolymer matrix-based fiber composites. These products are fire-resistant; they release no smoke and no toxic fumes. They were tested and recommended by major international institutions such as the American Federal Aviation Administration FAA. FAA selected the carbon-geopolymer composite as the best candidate for the fire-resistant cabin program (1994-1997). Geopolymers are attractive host materials to immobilise nuclear waste due to their high environmental durability and flexibility to compositional changes of waste. They are already used on industrial scale to immobilise difficult radioactive waste streams in Czech Republic and Slovakia.

Fire-resistant material

Flashover is a phenomenon unique to compartment fires where incomplete combustion products accumulate at the ceiling and ignite causing total involvement of the compartment materials and signaling the end to human survivability. Consequently, in a compartment fire the time to flashover is the time available for escape and this is the single most important factor in determining the fire hazard of a material or set of materials in a compartment fire. The Federal Aviation Administration has used the time-to-flashover of materials in aircraft cabin tests as the basis for a heat release and heat release rate acceptance criteria for cabin materials for commercial aircraft. The figure shows how the best organic-matrix made of engineering thermoplastics reaches flashover after the 20 minute ignition period and generates appreciable smoke, while the geopolymer-matrix composite will never ignite, reach flashover, or generate any smoke in a compartment fire.

Carbon-geopolymer composite is applied on racing cars around exhaust parts. This technology could be transferred and applied for the mass production of regular automobile parts (corrosion-resistant exhaust pipes and the like) as well as heat shields. A well-known motorcar manufacturer already developed a geopolymer-composite exhaust pipe system.

Geopolymer cements

Production of geopolymer cement requires an aluminosilicate precursor material such as metakaolin or fly ash, a user-friendly alkaline reagent (for example, sodium or potassium soluble silicates with a molar ratio MR SiO2:M2O ≥ 1.65, M being Na or K) and water (See the definition for "user-friendly" reagent below). Room temperature hardening is more readily achieved with the addition of a source of calcium cations, often blast furnace slag.

Portland cement chemistry vs geopolymer chemistry

Left: hardening of Portland cement (P.C.) through hydration of calcium silicate into calcium silicate hydrate (C-S-H) and portlandite, Ca(OH)2.

Right: hardening (setting) of geopolymer cement (GP) through poly-condensation of potassium oligo-(sialate-siloxo) into potassium poly(sialate-siloxo) cross linked network.

Geopolymer cement categories
The categories comprise:
Slag-based geopolymer cement.
Rock-based geopolymer cement.
Fly ash-based geopolymer cement
Type 1: alkali-activated fly ash geopolymer.
Type 2: slag/fly ash-based geopolymer cement.
Ferro-sialate-based geopolymer cement.

Slag-based geopolymer cement
Components: metakaolin (MK-750) + blast furnace slag + alkali silicate (user-friendly).

Geopolymeric make-up: Si:Al = 2 in fact solid solution of Si:Al=1, Ca-poly(di-sialate) (anorthite type) + Si:Al = 3 , K-poly(sialate-disiloxo) (orthoclase type) and C-S-H Ca-silicate hydrate.

The first geopolymer cement developed in the 1980s was of the type (K,Na,Ca)-poly(sialate) (or slag-based geopolymer cement) and resulted from the research developments carried out by Joseph Davidovits and J.L. Sawyer at Lone Star Industries, USA and yielded the invention of Pyrament® cement. The American patent application was filed in 1984 and the patent US 4,509,985 was granted on April 9, 1985, with the title 'Early high-strength mineral polymer'.

Rock-based geopolymer cement
The replacement of a certain amount of MK-750 with selected volcanic tuffs yields geopolymer cement with better properties and less CO2 emission than the simple slag-based geopolymer cement.

Manufacture components: metakaolin MK-750, blast furnace slag, volcanic tuffs (calcined or not calcined), mine tailings and alkali silicate (user-friendly).

Geopolymeric make-up: Si:Al = 3, in fact solid solution of Si:Al=1 Ca-poly(di-sialate) (anorthite type) + Si:Al = 3-5 (Na,K)-poly(silate-multisiloxo) and C-S-H Ca-silicate hydrate.

Fly ash-based geopolymer cements
Later on, in 1997, building on the works conducted on slag-based geopolymeric cements, on the one hand and on the synthesis of zeolites from fly ashes on the other hand, Silverstrim et al. and van Jaarsveld and van Deventer developed geopolymeric fly ash-based cements. Silverstrim et al. US Patent 5,601,643 was titled 'Fly ash cementitious material and method of making a product'.

CO2 emissions during manufacture
According to the Australian concrete expert B. V. Rangan, the growing worldwide demand for concrete is a great opportunity for the development of geopolymer cements of all types, with their much lower tally of carbon dioxide CO2. In 2021, a life cycle assessment study performed by researchers from the University of New South Wales (UNSW Sydney), Australia, confirmed that geopolymer mortars establish compressive strength and flexural strength that are adequate for construction applications and present sustainability benefits in Global Warming Potential, which suggests them to be potential substitutions for Ordinary Portland Cement. However, the industrial waste treatment (i.e., preparation of fly ash) depletes water bodies and the sodium silicate induces significant environmental burdens during its manufacture, becoming the key factor to enhance the geopolymer’s sustainability.

The need for standards
In June 2012, the institution ASTM International organized a symposium on Geopolymer Binder Systems. The introduction to the symposium states: When performance specifications for Portland cement were written, non-portland binders were uncommon...New binders such as geopolymers are being increasingly researched, marketed as specialty products, and explored for use in structural concrete. This symposium is intended to provide an opportunity for ASTM to consider whether the existing cement standards provide, on the one hand, an effective framework for further exploration of geopolymer binders and, on the other hand, reliable protection for users of these materials.

The existing Portland cement standards are not adapted to geopolymer cements. They must be created by an ad hoc committee. Yet, to do so, requires also the presence of standard geopolymer cements. Presently, every expert is presenting his own recipe based on local raw materials (wastes, by-products or extracted). There is a need for selecting the right geopolymer cement category. The 2012 State of the Geopolymer R&D, suggested to select two categories, namely:
Type 2 slag/fly ash-based geopolymer cement: fly ashes are available in the major emerging countries;
and
Ferro-sialate-based geopolymer cement: this geological iron rich raw material is present in all countries throughout the globe.
and
the appropriate user-friendly geopolymeric reagent.

Geopolymer applications to arts and archaeology
Because geopolymer artifacts look like natural stone, several artists started to cast in silicone rubber molds replications of their sculptures. For example, in the 1980s, the French artist Georges Grimal worked on several geopolymer castable stone formulations.

Egyptian pyramid stones 

With respect to archaeological applications, in the mid-1980s, Joseph Davidovits  presented his first analytical results carried out on genuine pyramid stones. He claimed that the ancient Egyptians knew how to generate a geopolymeric reaction in the making of a re-agglomerated limestone blocks. The Ukrainian scientist G.V. Glukhovsky endorsed Davidovits' research in his keynote paper to the First Intern. Conf. on Alkaline Cements and Concretes, Kiev, Ukraine, 1994. Later on, several materials scientists and physicists took over these archaeological studies and are publishing their results, essentially on pyramid stones.

Roman cements
From the digging of ancient Roman ruins, one knows that approximately 95% of the concretes and mortars constituting the Roman buildings consist of a very simple lime cement, which hardened slowly through the precipitating action of carbon dioxide CO2, from the atmosphere and formation of calcium silicate hydrate (C-S-H). This is a very weak to medium good material that was used essentially in the making of foundations and in buildings for the populace.

But for the building of their "ouvrages d’art", especially works related to water storage (cisterns, aqueducts), the Roman architects did not hesitate to use more sophisticated and expensive ingredients. These outstanding Roman cements are based on the calcic activation of ceramic aggregates (in Latin testa, analogue to our modern metakaolin MK-750) and alkali rich volcanic tuffs (cretoni, zeolitic pozzolan), respectively with lime. MAS-NMR Spectroscopy investigations were carried out on these high-tech Roman cements dating to the 2nd century AD. They show their geopolymeric make-up.

See also
Geopolymer cement
Zeolite

References

Bibliography
Geopolymer Chemistry and Applications, Joseph Davidovits, Institut Géopolymère, Saint-Quentin, France, 2008,  (3rd ed., 2011). In Chinese: National Defense Industry Press, Beijing, 2012.
Geopolymers Structure, processing, properties and industrial applications, John L. Provis and Jannie S. J. van Deventer, Woodhead Publishing, 2009, .

External links
Geopolymer Institute: https://www.geopolymer.org/
Geopolymer Alliance: https://web.archive.org/web/20130409024601/http://geopolymers.com.au/

 
Aluminosilicates
Building materials
Cement
Ceramic materials
Geochemistry
Inorganic chemistry
Inorganic polymers
Materials science
Polymers
Resins
Silicates